The Mansoori Al Mansoori are the Muslim community found in the states of Gujarat, Rajasthan, Uttar Pradesh, Bihar, and north India.

History and origin
This community consists of local converts and foreigners who migrated from outside subcontinent, Persia and Afghanistan, and have been involved in the traditional occupation of cotton ginning/trading[8]. Some of Mansoori is converted Muslims and those people believes in their original Rajput caste. According to history, they came from Rajasthan to Gujarat at the time of the form of Ran Singh and resided here. Even today, their main caste - Rao, Deora, Chauhan, Bhati, which is also a Rajput clan[2]. The main origin of this community from Afghanistan and some of whose converted Muslim from Rajput's. But they were called, Dhuniya by the Hindu community and it's also mentioned that Dhuniya, was stated to the Hindu carder not for Muslim carders.[4] Until some times ago no name in this community as surname, now some people using Pathan/Khan and some using Mansoori as a surname because the ancestor's of this community was Persian Muslims and from Afghanistan.[1] Tipu Sultan (Sultan Fateh Ali Khan Bahadur Tipu) belonged to this community.
Many members of this community migrated to Pakistan in 1947 and have settled in Karachi and Sindh.

The Mansoori are Sunni Muslim of the Barelvi & Deoband sect. They speak Urdu, and various dialects of Hindi. Their customs are similar to other Uttar Pradesh Muslims.

Notable people
Mohammad Israil Mansuri, Indian politician
Kalimuddin Shams, Indian politician
Farmud Nadaf, Nepalese politician
Adil Mansuri, Indian poet
Nazir Mansuri, Novelist

References

Social groups of Gujarat